The Gentiles is a 2021 Spanish drama film directed by Santi Amodeo which stars África de la Cruz and Paula Díaz alongside Olga Navalón, Lola Buero and Alva Inger.

Plot 
Set in Seville, the plot tracks Ana, a teenager and social media enthusiast who feels attracted to Corrales, and which otherwise becomes acquainted with a suicide-related game.

Cast

Production 
The film was produced by Grupo Tranquilo PC, Sacromonte Films and Las Gentiles AIE, with the participation of Canal Sur and funding from Junta de Andalucía. Shooting began in February 2021 in Seville.  Alex Catalán was responsible for the cinematography. The music was composed by Bronquio and Amodeo himself.

Release 
The film was presented at the 18th Seville European Film Festival in November 2021. It also screened at the Tallinn Festival. Distributed by Alfa Pictures, it was theatricallly released in Spain on 3 June 2022.

Reception 
Paula Arantzazu Ruiz of Cinemanía rated the film 3 out of 5 stars, writing that  "encouraged by a suggestive clash between reality and virtuality", "the classic generational conflict" is resolved by Amodeo "with an unexpected and conventional way out", perhaps excessive for the reviewer, summing up as a bottom line: "live fast, die young and leave a beautiful story on Instagram".

Eulàlia Iglesia of Fotogramas also scored 3 out of 5 stars, considering that Amodeo "records with enviable naturalness the disorientation of youth in the time of social media", while citing the "excessive" shock value of the final twist as a negative point.

Javier Ocaña of El País considered the film to be "a story of exultant attitude and overwhelming personality in its young female characters".

Accolades 

|-
| rowspan = "13" align = "center" | 2023 || rowspan = "13" | 2nd Carmen Awards || colspan = "2" | Best Film ||  || rowspan = "13" | 
|-
| Best Director || Santi Amodeo || 
|-
| Best Original Screenplay || Santi Amodeo || 
|-
| Best Supporting Actress || Paula Díaz || 
|-
| Best New Actress || África de la Cruz || 
|-
| Best Editing || José M. G. Moyano, Darío García García || 
|-
| Best Art Direction || Ana Medina || 
|-
| Best Production Supervision || Esther Diana || 
|-
| Best Original Score || Bronquio, Santi Amodeo || 
|-
| Best Original Song || "Todo lo que llega un día se va" by Bronquio and Sebastián Orellana || 
|-
| Best Makeup and Hairstyles || Carmela Martín, Ana Medina Sánchez || 
|-
| Best Sound || Dani de Zayas, Carli Pérez Valero, Jorge Marín || 
|-
| Best Special Effects || Amparo Martínez, Laura Domínguez || 
|-
| align = "center" | 2023 || 31st Actors and Actresses Union Awards || Best New Actress || África de la Cruz ||  || 
|}

See also 
 List of Spanish films of 2022

References 

2021 drama films
Spanish drama films
Films about suicide
Films shot in the province of Seville
Sacromonte Films films
Films set in Seville
2020s Spanish-language films
2020s Spanish films